The 1912 Villanova Wildcats football team represented the Villanova University during the 1912 college football season. The Wildcats team captain was Timothy Spillane.

Schedule

References

Villanova
Villanova Wildcats football seasons
Villanova Wildcats football